Hemang-Lower Denkyira District is one of the twenty-two districts in Central Region, Ghana. Originally it was formerly part of the then-larger Twifo/Heman/Lower Denkyira District; until the southeast area of the district was split off to create Hemang-Lower Denkyira District on 28 June 2012; thus the remaining part has been renamed as Twifo-Atti Morkwa District. The district assembly is the northwest part of Central Region and has Twifo Hemang as its capital town.

References

Central Region (Ghana)

Districts of the Central Region (Ghana)